2702 may refer to:

2702 Batrakov asteroid
Hirth 2702 two stroke aircraft engine
Unit 2702 - a fictional military unit from the book Cryptonomicon
The year in the 28th century